Ischnomesidae is a family of isopods belonging to the order Isopoda.

Genera:
 Contrarimesus Kavanagh & Wilson, 2007
 Cornuamesus Kavanagh & Wilson, 2007
 Fortimesus Kavanagh & Wilson, 2007
 Gracilimesus Kavanagh & Wilson, 2007
 Haplomesus Richardson, 1908
 Heteromesus Richardson, 1908
 Ischnomesus Richardson, 1908
 Mixomesus Wolff, 1962
 Stylomesus Wolff, 1956

References

Isopoda